The 1885 Massachusetts gubernatorial election was held on November 3. Incumbent Republican Governor George D. Robinson was re-elected to a third term in office over Democratic Mayor of Boston Frederick O. Prince.

General election

Results

See also
 1885 Massachusetts legislature

References

Governor
1885
Massachusetts
November 1885 events